Wojeck is a Canadian dramatic television series, which aired on CBC Television from 1966 to 1968. It was arguably the first successful drama series on English Canadian television.

Plot 
Steve Wojeck is a crusading big city coroner who regularly fights moral injustices raised by the deaths he investigated. He often tackles tough and controversial issues. The first episode of the series examines the role of racism in the suicide of a young Ojibwe man.

Main cast 
 John Vernon as Steve Wojeck
 Patricia Collins as Marty Wojeck
 Ted Follows as Crown Attorney Arnold (Arnie) Bateman
 Carl Banas as Sgt. Bryon James
 Jennifer Dale played Wojeck's daughter in the 1992 TV movie.

Production 
The show was inspired by the career of Dr. Morton Shulman.

Although it was one of the highest-rated shows on Canadian television in its time, only 20 episodes of the series were made, because Vernon was lured to Hollywood by the promise of more money than the CBC could offer. He only returned to the role once, for a TV movie Wojeck: Out of the Fire (1992). The first season (1966-67) was filmed in black and white, while season two (1967–68) was shot in colour.

Forensic pathology theme 
Wojeck was the first TV series to feature forensic pathology in the investigation of crime and has been the central theme of several other TV mystery-suspense dramas, beginning with the BBC's The Expert in 1968. Other programs include:
 Quincy, M.E., USA, 1976
 Silent Witness, UK (BBC), 1996
 Da Vinci's Inquest, Canada (CBC), 1998
 Waking The Dead, UK (BBC), 2000
 CSI: Crime Scene Investigation, U.S. (CBS), 2000; and its spinoffs, including:
 CSI: Miami, U.S. (CBS), 2002
 CSI: NY, U.S. (CBS), 2004
 Crossing Jordan, U.S. (NBC), 2001
 Bones, U.S. (Fox), 2005
 RIS Delitti Imperfetti, Italy (Canale 5), 2005
 R.I.S, police scientifique, France (TF1), 2006
 Post Mortem, Germany (RTL), 2007
 R. I. S. – Die Sprache der Toten, Germany (Sat.1), 2007
 Rizzoli & Isles, U.S. (TNT), 2010
 Body of Proof, U.S. (ABC), 2011
 The Coroner UK, (BBC), 2015
 Coroner, Canada, (CBC), 2019

Episodes 
 "The Last Man in the World": Wojeck tries to find out who assisted the suicide of an Ojibwe Indian who was locked up in jail.  The episode has flashbacks that show the racism between First Nations people and white people.
 "Tell Them the Streets Are Dancing": This episode guest starred Bruno Gerussi (later of CBC's The Beachcombers) as a construction worker whose crew were forced to work in tunnels where some of them contracted caisson disease.  This episode would be seen in the United States as an episode of NBC's Bob Hope Presents the Chrysler Theatre and is listed in indexes as the show's pilot.
 "Another Wonderful Day"
 "After All, Who's Art Morrison?" This episode featured Margot Kidder (later of the 1978 film Superman as Lois Lane)
 "Listen, An Old Man Is Speaking"
 "Fair Egypt"
 "Thy Mother A Lady, Lovely and Bright"
 "Does Anybody Remember the Victim's Name?"
 "A Dime Harry Doesn't Need"
 "Pick A Time...Any Time"
 "All Aboard For Candyland"
 "Swing Low, Sweet Chariot" (Two-parter, guest starring Michael Learned, later of The Waltons)
 "You've Been Very Kind"
 "Another Dawn, Another Sunrise, Another Day"
 "Give Until It Hurts...And Then Some"
 "The Cold Smile of Friends" (Two-Parter)
 "Name of the Games People Play"
 "Chocolate Fudge With Walnuts"

Awards 
- At the 19th Canadian Film Awards in 1967, Episode 1, "The Last Man in the World", tied for Best Film for TV. Cinematographer Grahame Woods won the award for best Black-and-White Cinematography and Ron Kelly won for Best Director.

- In 2002, Wojeck became a MasterWorks honouree by the Audio-Visual Preservation Trust of Canada.

References

External links 

 Queen's University Directory of CBC Television Series (Wojeck archived listing link via archive.org)
 Museum of Broadcast Communications
 
 
 AVTrust.ca - Wojeck, MasterWorks 2002 (video clip)

1960s Canadian drama television series
CBC Television original programming
Canadian legal television series
1966 Canadian television series debuts
1968 Canadian television series endings